A Holiday Gift for You is an EP by Canadian artist Michael Bublé, released in the United Kingdom on December 1, 2010. The EP  was made available as a free download on the iTunes Store, becoming part of a 12 Days of Christmas promotion. The EP features tracks from three of Bublé's albums, More, Call Me Irresponsible and his live album, Michael Bublé Meets Madison Square Garden.

Track listing

Release history

References 

Michael Bublé albums
2010 EPs
2010 compilation albums
Reprise Records EPs